LNER Class Q1 may refer to:

 GNR Class K1 0-8-0 (later LNER Class Q1)
 LNER Thompson Class Q1 0-8-0T